François Tremblay is a Canadian politician, who was elected to the National Assembly of Quebec in the 2018 provincial election. He represents the electoral district of Dubuc as a member of the Coalition Avenir Québec.

References

Living people
Coalition Avenir Québec MNAs
21st-century Canadian politicians
People from Saguenay–Lac-Saint-Jean
Year of birth missing (living people)